Neoepimorius lineola is a species of snout moth in the genus Neoepimorius. It was described by Whalley in 1964, and is known from Brazil (including Sao Paulo, the type location).

References

Moths described in 1964
Tirathabini